Sacha Moldovan (Shaya Shnayder; November 4, 1901 – 1982) was a Russian-born American expressionist and post-impressionist painter.

Biography 
Born to a Jewish family in Kishinev, Bessarabia (in Imperial Russia), where his parents Gdal Shnayder and Bunya Moldovan got married in 1891. He immigrated to the United States, studied in Paris, and became unyieldingly devoted to his work throughout his years.

Moldovan is known to have worked with many other artists, including Henri Matisse and Chaïm Soutine. The noted art critic Marla Berg once said of Moldavan, "Had van Gogh painted Matisse's pictures while dreaming of Chagall, the result would have been the works of Sacha Moldovan". Alongside these artists, he was influenced by Chaïm Soutine, and Pierre Bonnard.

The highest price every paid for a Moldovan was $50,000 for original sold by Hammer Galleries at a one-man show in Manhattan (1991). Moldovan has one daughter, Wendy Moldovan, who today retains many of Sacha's works.

Moldovan's great-nephew, Jonathan Herbert, is also painter. He works in a studio in Brooklyn, NY.

Selected works 
 The Woods
 Garden Fence
 Blue Teapot
 Sailboats in a Harbor
 Onions
  An Evening Stroll
 Park Bench
 Men Coming and Going
 Veronique Reading

References 

 Ken Hall, Rediscovering Moldovan
 Sacha Moldovan, "The Woods"

1901 births
1982 deaths
Artists from Chișinău
People from Kishinyovsky Uyezd
Moldovan Jews
Bessarabian Jews
Emigrants from the Russian Empire to the United States
Jewish American artists
20th-century American painters
American male painters
Post-impressionist painters
American Expressionist painters
20th-century American Jews
20th-century American male artists